Neely is both a surname and a given name. Notable people with the name include:

Surname 
 Adam Neely (born 1988), American bass player and YouTuber
 Anne Neely (born 1946), American painter
 Bill Neely (born 1959), British television journalist
 Blake Neely (born 1969), American film score composer
 Bob Neely (born 1953), ice hockey player
 Brad Neely (born 1976), American comic strip cartoonist
 Cam Neely (born 1965), Canadian ice hockey player
 Don Neely (born 1935), New Zealand cricket player and administrator
 Gary Neely (born 1974), Irish cricketer
 Jess Neely (1898-1983), American football coach
 Mark E. Neely, Jr. (born 1944), American historian
 Mason Neely (born 1979), American record producer
 Matthew M. Neely (1874–1958), American politician
 Pat Neely and Gina Neely (21st century), television hosts
 Peggy Neely (21st century), American politician
 Ralph Neely (1943-2022), American football player
 Richard Neely (1941-2020), American judge and politician
 Sam Neely (1948–2006), American country musician
 Sharlotte Neely (born 1948), American anthropologist 
 Stephanie Neely (21st century), American politician
 Thomas Neely (1897–1918), English recipient of the Victoria Cross

Given name 
 J. Neely Johnson (1825–1872), American lawyer and politician
 John Neely Bryan (1810–1877), American Presbyterian farmer, lawyer, and tradesman
 Neely Bruce (born 1944), American composer
 Neely Edwards (1883–1965), American film actor
 Neely Gray (1818–1867), American businessman and territorial legislator
 Neely Jenkins (born 1974), American singer
 Neely Tucker (born 1963), American journalist

Fictional characters
 Neely Capshaw, a fictional character on Baywatch
 Neely O'Hara, a fictional character in Valley of the Dolls
 Neely Crenshaw, a fictional character from the John Grisham novel Bleachers

See also
 13860 Neely, a main-belt asteroid
 Neely Nuclear Research Center, a research center at Georgia Tech
 Neely Mansion
 Neely Township
 Neeley
 Nealy

Unisex given names